The 2013 Columbus Lions season was the seventh season for the professional indoor football franchise and their second in the Professional Indoor Football League (PIFL). The Lions were one of seven teams that competed in the PIFL for the 2013 season.

The team played their home games under head coach Jason Gibson at the Columbus Civic Center in Columbus, Georgia. The Lions earned a 4–8 record, placing sixth in the league, failing to qualify for the playoffs.

Schedule
Key:

Regular season
All start times are local to home team

Roster

Division standings

References

External links
2013 results

Columbus Lions
Columbus Lions
Columbus Lions